Anna Carmela Incerti (born 19 January 1980 in Palermo) is an Italian long-distance runner who specializes in the marathon. She has represented Italy in the marathon at European, World and Olympic-level. She won the bronze in the event at the 2010 European Championships, later upgraded to silver and then to gold.

Biography
She was the 2003 winner of the Florence Marathon, which made her the Italian marathon champion for that year. She also won the bronze medal in 10,000 metres at the 2003 Summer Universiade. Incerti began focusing on longer distances and set a personal best in the marathon at the 2006 European Athletics Championships, running a time of 2:32:53 for ninth place. She finished 17th over the distance at the 2007 World Championships in Athletics.

She represented Italy at the 2008 Beijing Olympics and came fourteenth in the marathon with a personal best run of 2:30:55 hours. Later that year, she won the Milan Marathon in a new personal best time of 2:27:42 hours and finished the season with an Italian record run of 32:1 minutes for the 10K at the San Silvestre Barcelona.

Incerti won the Roma-Ostia Half Marathon in March 2009 and then secured the half marathon title at the 2009 Mediterranean Games in Pescara. At the 2010 European Athletics Championships she won the bronze medal in the marathon race, but was subsequently upgraded to the silver (following the disqualification of race winner Živilė Balčiūnaitė for a doping offence), then to the gold medal (following the disqualification of runner-up Nailiya Yulamanova).

She ran at the 2011 Osaka Ladies Marathon and improved her best time to 2:27:33, coming in fourth place. She also improved her half marathon best soon after, defeating Jessica Augusto to defend at the Roma-Ostia with a time of 1:09:06 – which was also a new course record. After some high altitude training in Ifrane in Morocco she ran at the Stramilano half marathon, but she felt her second-place finish behind Ababel Yeshaneh was not a good performance. She decided to enter the 2011 Berlin Marathon and she ran a significant personal best of 2:25:32 hours. She was runner-up to Valeria Straneo at the Stramilano in 2012 and was fifth in a competitive Roma-Ostia field.

She is married to fellow marathon runner Stefano Scaini.

Achievements

National titles

She won six national championships.
 Italian Athletics Championships
 10,000 metres: 2009 (1)
 10 km road: 2015 (1)
 Half marathon: 2007, 2008, 2019 (3)
 Marathon: 2003 (1)

See also
Italian all-time lists - 5000 metres
Italian all-time lists - Half marathon
Italian all-time lists - Marathon
Italian team at the running events

References

External links
 

1980 births
Living people
Italian female long-distance runners
Italian female marathon runners
Sportspeople from Palermo
Athletes (track and field) at the 2008 Summer Olympics
Athletes (track and field) at the 2012 Summer Olympics
Athletes (track and field) at the 2016 Summer Olympics
Olympic athletes of Italy
Athletics competitors of Fiamme Azzurre
European Athletics Championships medalists
Mediterranean Games gold medalists for Italy
Athletes (track and field) at the 2009 Mediterranean Games
Universiade medalists in athletics (track and field)
World Athletics Championships athletes for Italy
Mediterranean Games medalists in athletics
Universiade bronze medalists for Italy
Medalists at the 2003 Summer Universiade